Xazratishox ( or ) is an urban-type settlement in far eastern Uzbekistan. It is located in the Chortoq District, Namangan Region. Its population is 5,900 (2016). It is just across the border from Kyrgyzstan.

Nearby towns and villages include Iskavot (13 km), Zarkent (9 km), Uluk (4 km), Sary-Kashka (8 km), Bekobod (13 km) and Kerben (11 km).

References

Populated places in Namangan Region
Urban-type settlements in Uzbekistan